Waheguru is a word used in Sikhism to refer to God as described in Guru Granth Sahib.

The meaning of the word  (usually spelled in English as Waheguru) is traditionally explained as  'wondrous!', and guru, Sanskrit for 'teacher, spiritual guide, God', which taken together are said to carry the meaning, 'Wondrous Lord'.

The hymns to Waheguru contained in Guru Granth Sahib have been composed by Bhatt Gayand.

The word is also used in Sikhism as a main mantra and is called gurmantra or gurmantar.

See also 
Akal Purakh
Ik Onkar
Guru Gobind Singh

References 

Names of God in Sikhism
Sikh beliefs
Creator gods
Conceptions of God